Apisa cinereocostata is a moth of the family Erebidae. It was described by William Jacob Holland in 1893. It is found in Gabon, Ghana, Guinea, Ivory Coast and Nigeria.

References

Moths described in 1893
Syntomini
Fauna of Gabon
Erebid moths of Africa